Van Gyseghem is a surname. Notable people with the surname include:

André van Gyseghem (1906–1979), English actor and theatre director
Joanna Van Gyseghem (born 1941), English actress
Esther Van Gyseghem (1900–1975), founder of Patisserie Valerie

References

Surnames of Dutch origin